New Attitude is an album by American experimental rock group Dirty Projectors. It is a combination of rock songs, orchestral songs like those on Slaves' Graves and Ballads, and one live song recorded in 2006. Dave Longstreth has said the central image of the EP is one of two sheep counting one another in order to fall asleep—a theme that appears on two tracks as indicated by the lines "Counting one, one, one, one, one..." The last song was the lead single from the EP, and was reviewed by Pitchfork Media a few months before the EP was released.

Track listing

2006 EPs
Dirty Projectors albums
Marriage Records EPs
Albums produced by David Longstreth